Henry Labouchere, 1st Baron Taunton, PC (15 August 179813 July 1869) was a prominent British Whig and Liberal Party politician of the mid-19th century.

Background and education
Labouchere was born in Over Stowey, Somerset, into a Huguenot merchant family. His father was Peter Caesar Labouchere and his mother Dorothy Elizabeth, daughter of Sir Francis Baring. He was educated at Winchester College and Christ Church, Oxford, where he took his B.A. (1821) and his M.A. (1828).

Political career
In 1826, Labouchere became MP for St Michael, as a Whig. In 1830, he moved to the Taunton seat, which he held until 1859. In 1835 he was opposed by Benjamin Disraeli for the Taunton seat; Labouchere won by 452 votes to 282. He was first appointed to office by Lord Grey in 1832, serving as Civil Lord of the Admiralty . After beginning the second Melbourne ministry as Master of the Mint, Privy Counsellor, and Vice-President of the Board of Trade (and, later, Under-Secretary of State for War and the Colonies), Labouchere was raised to a cabinet post, President of the Board of Trade, which he held from 1839 until the Melbourne government fell in 1841.

When the Whigs, now led by Lord John Russell, returned to office in 1846, Labouchere returned to the cabinet, this time as Chief Secretary for Ireland. Under his administration the worst effects of the Great Irish Famine began to be felt in Ireland. The following year, he once again became President of the Board of Trade, and stayed in that post until Russell's government fell in 1852. From 1853 to 1854 he sat on the Royal Commission on the City of London.
Labouchere's final cabinet posting came during the first Palmerston ministry, for which he served as Secretary of State for the Colonies from 1855 to 1858. In 1859, Labouchere was raised to the peerage as Baron Taunton, of Taunton in the County of Somerset. Between 1864 and 1868 the then Lord Taunton chaired the Schools Enquiry Commission.

Family
In 1840 Labouchere married his first cousin Frances, daughter of Sir Thomas Baring. They had three daughters:
 Emily (1844–1933) who married Henry Eliot, 5th Earl of St Germans
 Mina Francis, who married Sir Arthur Ellis
 Mary Dorothy who married Edward James Stanley MP

Frances snr died in 1850, aged 36.

In 1852 Labouchere married Lady Mary Howard (1823–1892) daughter of the Earl of Carlisle. There were no children from this marriage. Lady Mary was buried at St Mary's Church, Charlynch, Somerset where a reredos was erected in 1893 in her memory.

Taunton died in July 1869, aged 70, at his London house in Belgrave Square. He was buried near his country house Quantock Lodge at Over Stowey. As he had no sons the barony became extinct on his death. His nephew, also Henry Labouchere, inherited part of Labouchere's fortune, and was later to become a well-known newspaper editor and politician.

Arms

References

External links
 
 

Taunton, Henry Labouchere, 1st Baron
Taunton, Henry Labouchere, 1st Baron
Taunton, Henry Labouchere, 1st Baron
Lords of the Admiralty
Members of the Privy Council of the United Kingdom
Members of the Privy Council of Ireland
People from Sedgemoor (district)
Taunton, Henry Labouchere, 1st Baron
Liberal Party (UK) MPs for English constituencies
Whig (British political party) MPs for English constituencies
UK MPs 1826–1830
UK MPs 1830–1831
UK MPs 1831–1832
UK MPs 1832–1835
UK MPs 1835–1837
UK MPs 1837–1841
UK MPs 1841–1847
UK MPs 1847–1852
UK MPs 1852–1857
UK MPs 1857–1859
UK MPs who were granted peerages
English Anglicans
Members of the Parliament of the United Kingdom for Mitchell
Chief Secretaries for Ireland
Secretaries of State for the Colonies
Presidents of the Board of Trade
Peers of the United Kingdom created by Queen Victoria